The Melchior Islands are a group of many low, ice-covered islands lying near the center of Dallmann Bay in the Palmer Archipelago, Antarctica. They were first seen but left unnamed by a German expedition under Eduard Dallmann, 1873–74. The islands were resighted and roughly charted by the Third French Antarctic Expedition under Jean-Baptiste Charcot, 1903–05. 

Charcot named what he believed to be the large easternmost island in the group "Île Melchior" after Vice Admiral Jules Melchior of the French Navy, but later surveys proved Charcot's Île Melchior to be two islands, now called Eta Island and Omega Island. The name Melchior Islands has since become established for the whole island group now described, of which Eta Island and Omega Island form the eastern part, while the Sigma Islands mark the northern limit of the islands. The group was roughly surveyed in 1927 by Discovery Investigations personnel in the RRS Discovery, and was resurveyed by Argentine expeditions in 1942 and 1943, and again in 1948.

The semi-circular arrangement of Lambda, Epsilon, Alpha and Delta Islands forms a small harbor called Inner Harbor. Its descriptive name was probably given by Discovery Investigations personnel who roughly surveyed the harbor in 1927. It was resurveyed by Argentine expeditions in 1942, 1943 and 1948.

Features 
 Bremen Island
 Harpun Rocks
 Normanna Reef
 Pabellon Island
 Psi Islands
 Tripod Island

See also

References

External links

Islands of the Palmer Archipelago